Marina Zolotova is a Belarusian journalist, chief editor of Tut.by media outlet since 2004. In 2021 she was arrested under charges of large-scale tax evasion; later political charges were added to her case. She is considered a political prisoner by the European Union, the United States of America, and numerous human rights defenders. On March 17, 2023, she was sentenced to 12 years in prison.

Biography

Early years and family 
Zolotova was born in Minsk in 1977. She graduated from BSU Philology department. Zolotova speaks Bulgarian. She worked at the Institute of Science Research, then at the BelaPAN agency.

Tut.by 

In Summer 2004, Zolotova started working at Tut.by. Very soon she became chief editor of the outlet. Under Zolotova Tut.by launched its own news block and gradually opened other departments, dedicated to sports, culture, fashions, etc. While in 2004 the site had only 6000 unique visitors per day, by 2020 it grew into the biggest Belarusian Internet media with more than 50 journalists in staff and daily audience of more than 600000.

Political pressure and arrests

BelTA case 

On 7 August 2018, Investigative Committee of Belarus raided TUT.BY office in Minsk. Zolotova was arrested under charges of criminal offense for sharing passwords for paywalled BelTA newsfeed. The other journalists were soon released, but Zolotva was found guilty for ‘inaction of an official’ and sentenced to a fine of 300 Base amounts. Notably, the practice of sharing passwords is widespread in Belarusian media, BelTA took very few precautionary measures and never before served as a criminal complainant in court. The "BelTA case" was condemned by the United Nations, EU, US officials and numerous human rights defenders.

Arrest in 2021 

Following the large scale protests of 2020 after presidential election, 2021 became the year of massive state crackdown of independent media and journalists. On 18 May 2021, with several other Tut.by employees Zolotova was arrested under charges of tax evasion. Tut.by was 'punished' by authorities for covering the protests and publishing uncensored news while state-controlled media tried to create fake impression of calm and undisturbed post-election country. Zolotova was put into Volodarka pre-trial detention centre. The sad irony is that her grandmother was imprisoned in Volodarka 80 years ago. Elena Ivanovna Nikolaeva, Zolotova's grandmother, was a head doctor in Minsk hospital. During Nazi occupation, she was arrested and then sent sent to forced labour in Germany for hiding and saving Jew children.

On 14 September 2021, Bundestag deputy Alois Rainer announced taking over the good parenthood for Zolotova.

By 18 June 2022, most employees of Tut.by were released from prison, however, they remained suspects, most of them have been put on the KGB terrorist list. Although it was initially stated that Zolotova and Chekina would only face economic charges, on 9 January 2023, they were officially accused of "inciting hatred" and "calls for sanctions, other actions aimed at harming the national security of the Republic of Belarus" under chapters 243.2 and 361.3 of State Criminal Code. Zolotova is denied visits, the trial is closed. The case is unanimously considered political by her colleagues, international community and human rights defenders. In late January 2023, Zolotova's lawyer had her license revoked. Despite woman's 20 years experience in the field, the bar claimed her to be insufficiently competent.

On March 17, 2023, Minsk City Court sentenced Zolotova and Liudmila Chekina, general director of Tut.by, to 12 years in a general regime penal colony for tax evasion, inciting hatred and calling for actions against the national security of Belarus.

References 

Living people
1977 births
Belarusian journalists
Belarusian media executives
Belarusian dissidents
Political prisoners according to Viasna Human Rights Centre